Unión Baloncesto La Palma is a professional basketball team based in Santa Cruz de La Palma, Canary Islands.

In 2012, the club announced the senior team would cease in activity.

Season by season

Trophies and awards

Individual awards
LEB Plata MVP
Rahshon Turner – 2001

Notes and references

External links
Federación Española de Baloncesto
UB La Palma Official Page

Defunct basketball teams in Spain
Basketball teams established in 1978
Sport in La Palma
Former LEB Oro teams
Former LEB Plata teams
Basketball teams disestablished in 2012
1978 establishments in Spain
2012 disestablishments in Spain
Basketball teams in the Canary Islands